Moni Sar (also Romanized as  Monī Sar; also known as Mane-Sīr, Manīser, Manīsur, and Monīşer) is a village in Gheyzaniyeh Rural District, in the Central District of Ahvaz County, Khuzestan Province, Iran. At the 2006 census, its population was 140, in 16 families.

References 

Populated places in Ahvaz County